On 13 August 2021, Blue Origin filed a complaint to the United States Court of Federal Claims about NASA's award of $2.9 billion to SpaceX. The award was used by the company to further develop Starship HLS, a lunar lander that NASA selected for the Artemis program. On 4 November 2021, the Court of Federal Claims dismissed the complaint, and the accompanying memorandum opinion was titled Blue Origin v. United States & Space Exploration Technologies Corp. Blue Origin's complaint and prior actions have received extensive attention from the news media and spaceflight industries.

Background 
In December 2018, NASA announced it was seeking lunar lander proposals under the Artemis program, which is released under Appendix E of its NeXTSTEP-2 program.

Government Accountability Office 
On 26 April 2021, both Blue Origin and Dynetics filed formal protests with the US Government Accountability Office claiming that NASA had improperly evaluated aspects of the proposals. On 30 April 2021, NASA suspended the Starship HLS contract and funding until such time as the GAO could issue a ruling on the protests. In May 2021, Sen. Cantwell, from Blue Origin's state of Washington, introduced an amendment to the "Endless Frontier Act" that directed NASA to reopen the HLS competition and select a second lander proposal, authorized spending of an additional US$10 billion. This funding would require a separate appropriations act. Sen. Sanders criticized the amendment as a "multibillion dollar Bezos bailout", as the money would likely go to Blue Origin, which was founded by Jeff Bezos. The act, including this amendment, was passed by the Senate on 8 June 2021.

On 30 July 2021, the GAO rejected the protests and found that "NASA did not violate procurement law" in awarding the contract to SpaceX, who bid a much lower cost and more capable system. Nevertheless, CNBC reported on 4 August that "Jeff Bezos' space company remains on the offensive in criticizing NASA's decision to award Elon Musk's SpaceX with the sole contract to build a vehicle to land astronauts on the moon" and the company had produced an infographic highlighting several Starship deficiencies compared to the Blue Origin proposal, but noted the infographic avoided showing the Blue Origin bid price as roughly double the SpaceX bid price. Soon after the appeal was rejected, NASA made the contracted initial payment of US$300M to SpaceX.

Filing 
On 13 August 2021, Blue Origin filed a lawsuit in the US Court of Federal Claims challenging "NASA's unlawful and improper evaluation of proposals." Blue Origin asked the court for an injunction to halt further spending by NASA on the existing contract with SpaceX. Reaction to the lawsuit was mostly negative in the space community, at NASA, and among Blue Origin employees according to space journalist Eric Berger. The judge dismissed the suit on 4 November 2021 and NASA was allowed to resume working with SpaceX.

Outcome 
According to a filing in the Court of Federal Claims dated November 4, 2021, the case was dismissed. The decision was made after the facts of the case were considered by the Court of Federal Claims. The presiding judge was Richard A. Hertling. The court's finding provided in the document clarified that Blue Origin failed to establish foul play by NASA. Therefore, Blue Origin failed on merits, and its complaint was dismissed.

Prominence 
According to Eric Berger from Ars Technica, most of the space industry and Blue Origin employees reacted negatively to the company's complaint and related actions.

References 

2021 in case law
United States Court of Federal Claims